The 2018–19 Big 12 men's basketball season began with practices in October 2018, followed by the start of the 2018–19 NCAA Division I men's basketball season in November. Regular season conference play began in December 2018 and concluded in March 2018. Kansas State and Texas Tech won a share of the regular season Big 12 Championship, ending the streak of 14 consecutive conference titles for Kansas.

The Big 12 tournament was held from March 13 through 16 at the Sprint Center in Kansas City, Missouri. Iowa State defeated Kansas in the Big 12 tournament championship game to receive the conference's automatic bid to the NCAA tournament.

Baylor, Iowa State, Kansas, Kansas State, Oklahoma, and Texas Tech each received invitations to the NCAA tournament. Texas Tech advanced to the NCAA championship game where they lost to Virginia.

Coaches

Coaching changes 
There were no head coaching changes following the 2017–18 Big 12 Conference men's basketball season.

Head coaches 
Note: Stats are through the beginning of the season. All stats and records are from time at current school only.

Preseason

Big 12 Preseason Poll

Pre-Season All-Big 12 Team

Player of the Year: Dean Wade, Kansas State
Newcomer of the Year: Dedric Lawson, Kansas
Freshman of the Year: Quentin Grimes, Kansas

Rankings

Regular season

Conference matrix

Big 12/SEC Challenge

Postseason

Big 12 tournament

  March 13–16, 2019–Big 12 Conference Basketball Tournament, Sprint Center, Kansas City, MO.

Bracket

NCAA tournament

NIT

College Basketball Invitational

Honors and awards

All-Americans

To earn "consensus" status, a player must win honors from a majority of the following teams: the 
Associated Press, the USBWA, Sporting News, and the National Association of Basketball Coaches.

All-Big 12 awards and teams

Phillips 66 Big 12 Men’s Basketball Weekly Awards

See also
 2018–19 NCAA Division I men's basketball season
 Big 12 Conference
 Big 12/SEC Challenge

References